The Office of the Deputy Chief of Staff for Personnel, Department of the Army, United States Army, also known as the G-1 is responsible for development, management and execution of all manpower and personnel plans, programs and policies throughout the entire U.S. Army. As the principal human relations of the U.S, Army, it is dedicated to supporting and empowering soldiers, civilian employees, military families and veterans worldwide in peace or war. As such the office oversees recruiting, retention and sustainment of a high quality volunteer force through innovative and effective training programs. The primary objective of the office is to ensure readiness of its personnel to serve the needs of the Army as a whole across the full spectrum of its operations.

The Office includes in its organization:

Public Affairs Office
 Management Support Office
 Army G-1 Chief Information Office
 Assistant G-1 for Civilian Personnel
 Military Personnel Management Directorate
 Enlisted Division
 Professional Development Branch
 Distribution and Readiness Branch
 Analytical Cell
 Training Requirements Division
 Enlisted Accessions Division
 Officer Division
 Operations Division
 Human Systems Integration Directorate (MANPRINT)
 U.S. Army Research Institute for the Behavioral and Social Sciences (ARI)
 Army Resiliency Directorate 
 Human Resources Command
 Plans and Resources
 Military Strength Analysis and Forecasting Division
 Resources Division
 Resource Development Branch
 Program Analysis Branch
 Compensation and Entitlements Branch
 Plans Division
 Operations and Analysis Branch
 Combat Support/Services Support Branch and Combat Arms Branch
 Concepts Integration Branch
 Manpower Allocation Division
 Manpower Policy, Plans, and Programs Division

List of Deputy Chiefs of Staff for Personnel

References

External links
 Deputy Chief of Staff, Army G-1

Department of the Army staff
Human resource management